Bugg is a common dance style in Sweden and is very popular on the dancefloors, when  dansbands play. Bugg is a four-step dance and performed at different paces (120–180 BPM). Bugg is a partner dance and follows certain basic rules, but is essentially improvised, with the woman following the man's lead. Acrobatic moves are not allowed on national or international dancecompetitions. Swedish Bugg belongs to the swing dance family and closely resembles Modern Jive.

Bugg is both a very popular social dance as well as a competitive dance in Sweden. It also has the most competitors and practitioners within the Swedish Dancesport Federation.

There is also a variant called double bugg that is usually performed by one man and two women, but other combinations of three dancers may appear.

Short history
Swedish Bugg is a totally Swedish phenomenon and is also a variant of the early Lindy Hop (Jitterbug), which came to Sweden in the mid-1940s. In films from a famous dance place called Nalen in Stockholm, one can see the Swedish style of Lindy Hop (Jitterbug) in which the Swedish Bugg has its origins. This dance style was then developed to the modern style we see today, danced in places throughout Sweden and now beginning to spread around the globe. This style has of course various dialects and variants, but the bases are more or less equal throughout the country.

When the dance competitions began in Sweden during the mid 70s, there was only one class for all participants, namely Free style. This was then, in 1983, divided into two different dance styles, Social bugg and Free style. In 1984, this was changed again. A new style was created. These two new styles were then called Free style and Rock for a long period.

Later on, these two dance styles, more or less, were developed towards one single Bugg style and into what one can see today, yet with different dialects and variants throughout the country, but without the acrobatic elements. The Swedish Bugg was from now on practiced with great enthusiasm by many dancers and in all ages, from all of Sweden. Today, the Swedish Bugg is one of the most popular social dances in Swedish danceclubs (ext link: swedish dance clubs. It can also provide a gateway into other dance styles.

See also
List of dance style categories
List of dances
Competitive dance

Dance in Sweden
Dancesport
Competitive dance
Swing dances
Social dance